Vårberg is a suburb  in the Skärholmen borough in the Söderort region of Stockholm, Sweden.

Location
Vårberg borders Skärholmen, Vårby gård, Huddinge, Estbröte, Kungshatt, and Ekerö. It has an area of 197 hectares of land and 65 hectares of water. Its population is 8,454 as of 31 December 2007. Vårberg contains the highest natural point in Stockholm, Vikingaberget, which is 77.24 meters above sea level. Vårberg also includes Vårbergstoppen, an artificial hill which was built from spoil from the excavation the Stockholm metro and which at 90 meters above sea level is the highest point of land in Stockholm.

History
The original Vårberg  city plan  was formulated in the regional plan in 1958.
Vårberg was incorporated into Stockholm on January 1, 1963.
Between 1965 and 1968, 14 city plans were prepared by the Stockholm City Building Office.
The center of Vårberg was built was inaugurated in September 1968.
The area was built with apartment buildings and townhouses, and the center was designed by architect Hack Kampman (1913-2005.
Vårberg has a station (Vårberg metro station) on the Stockholm Metro on line 13 between Vårby gård metro station and Skärholmen metro station. The artistic decoration with mosaic paintings depicting hands by artist Maria Ängquist Klyvare was performed in 1996.

References

See also
Vårberg metro station

Districts of Stockholm